Mat Hennek (born 1969 in Freiburg im Breisgau) is a German fine art photographer.

Biography 
Mat Hennek worked for newspapers and radio stations before starting his artistic training at Europäische Akademie für Bildende Kunst in Trier and at Lette-Verein in Berlin. In 1995 Hennek became assistant to Hermann Stamm the photographer Uwe Arens.

His photographs were published in magazines worldwide: Cosmopolitan, Frankfurter Allgemeine Zeitung, GQ, Marie Claire, Max, Playboy, Süddeutsche Zeitung Magazin, Vogue, ZEITmagazin.

In 1998 Hennek was founding the agency "Kasskara" in Berlin. Beyond others Mat Hennek worked for big record companies and music labels such as Deutsche Grammophon, Four Music, EMI, Sony BMG, Universal Music Group and Virgin Records.

Since then Mat Hennek took numerous portrait photographs of classical Musicians and artists: soloists such as Hilary Hahn, Krystian Zimerman, Hélène Grimaud, Lang Lang, Nelson Freire, Alison Balsom, conductors such as Simon Rattle, Kent Nagano, Claudio Abbado, Valery Gergiev and opera singers such as Rolando Villazón, Anna Netrebko, Thomas Quasthoff, Bryn Terfel and in another musical repertoire artists such as David Byrne, Lizz Wright, Rammstein, Seeed, Sting, Tracy Chapman, Rufus Wainwright, Daniel Libeskind, Alex Katz and Giora Feidman.

Furthermore, Hennek photographed advertising campaigns for well-known brands like Montblanc, Lufthansa, Rolex and Volkswagen.

In 2006 Hennek shifted the focus of his work to art photography. His fine art photography has been featured in solo exhibits in galleries, museums and art fairs in Europe, Asia and in the USA.

In 2017 the art book "Woodlands – Mat Hennek" was published by Steidl. In 2020, Steidl published Hennek's second book "Silent Cities".

Hennek lives with his partner, the French pianist Hélène Grimaud in Upstate New York, United States.

Works 
 The Soul of Music (Die Seele der Musik)
 Woodlands
 Ancient Writings
 Trees of Tel Aviv
 Waves of Tel Aviv
 Sounds of Spheres
 Mirages
 Dream Catchers
 Palmen im Sturm
 Sacred Spirits 
 Cityscapes
 Blue Range

Publications 
"Woodlands – Mat Hennek", published 2017 by Steidl

"Silent Cities", published 2020 by Steidl

Exhibitions

Individual exhibitions 
2009
 "Woodlands", Dramaturgie von Fotos und Musik (in Zusammenarbeit mit der Pianistin Hélène Grimaud), Mecklenburg-Vorpommern Music Festival – Germany
 "The Soul of Music  |  Die Seele der Musik", Villa Wahnfried, Bayreuth – Germany
 "The Soul of Music  |  Die Seele der Musik", Ocean Sun Festival – MS Europa / Hapag-Lloyd musikalische Kreuzfahrten
 "Woodlands", Hotel Grand Hyatt Berlin – Germany
2010
 "Woodlands and beyond...", Flo Peters Gallery, Hamburg – Germany
 "Woodlands and beyond...", Private Sammlung Roosen-Trinks, Berlin – Germany
2011
 "The2Circles" Galerie 64bis, Paris – France
 "The2Circles" Bernheimer Fine Art Photography, Munich – Germany
 "The2Circles" Leica Galerie Salzburg – Austria
 "The2Circles" Hammer Gallery, Zürich – Switzerland
 "Die Seele der Music  |  The Soul of Music" Leica Gallery Tokyo – Japan
2012
 "Woodlands and beyond..." 1839 Contemporary Gallery Taipei – Taiwan
2014
 "The Soul of Music  |  Die Seele der Musik" Galerie Bernheimer Luzern – Switzerland
2015
 "Woodlands" Stadtmuseum Bad Hersfeld, Germany
 "WOODLANDS and beyond…” Flo Peters Gallery Hamburg, Germany

Group exhibitions 
2009
 "Landscapes", Bernheimer Fine Art Photography, Munich – Germany
 "Let's Party für ein Kunstwerk", Pinakothek der Moderne, Munich – Germany
2010
 "Inner Landscapes, Contemporary Israeli Photography", Bernheimer Fine Art Photography, Munich – Germany
 "Schauplätze", Villa Erlengut, Erlenbach am Zürichsee – Switzerland
 Paris Photo 2010 – Carrousel du Louvre – Bernheimer Fine Art Photography – France
2011
 "Janvier sous la neige", Galerie Baudoin Lebon, Paris – France
 Montblanc International Exhibit, Genf – Switzerland
2012
 Ærena Galleries & Gardens, California – USA
2015
 "Summertime" Galerie Bernheimer, Munich – Germany
 Paris Photo 2015 – Grand Palais Paris – Bernheimer Fine Art Photography – France
2016
 artgenève 2016 – Palexpo SA Genf – Bernheimer Fine Art – Geneva, Switzerland
 "Booth D9 – Sélection Paris Photo – Bernheimer Fine Art, Lucerne – Switzerland
 Pictorial Recital: "WOODLANDS and beyond…" Elbphilharmonie Hamburg, Germany
 artgenève 2017 – Palexpo SA Genf – Bernheimer Fine Art – Geneva, Switzerland
 "THE WORLD IS A BOOK AND THOSE WHO DO NOT TRAVEL READ ONLY ONE PAGE." Bernheimer Fine Art, Lucerne, Switzerland
 "C.A.R. – Contemporary Art Ruhr" – Immagis Fine Art Photography – Essen, Germany
 "Highlights" Intern. Art Fair – Bernheimer Fine Art – Munich, Germany
2017
 Paris Photo 2017  |  Grand Palais – Bernheimer Fine Art Photography  |  Paris, France | 09.11 – 12 November 2017
 Pictorial Recital: "WOODLANDS and beyond…"  |  Photo Installation: Mat Hennek / Piano: Hélène Grimaud  |  Philharmonie Paris  |  Paris, France | 25 October 2017
 Pictorial Recital: "WOODLANDS and beyond…"  |  Photo Installation: Mat Hennek / Piano: Hélène Grimaud  |  BASF Feierabendhaus  |  Ludwigshafen, Germany | 23 October 2017
 Pictorial Recital: "WOODLANDS and beyond…"  |  Photo Installation: Mat Hennek / Piano: Hélène Grimaud  |  KKL Lucerne  |  Lucerne, Switzerland | 21 October 2017
 Pictorial Recital: "WOODLANDS and beyond…"  |  Photo Installation: Mat Hennek / Piano: Hélène Grimaud  |  Elbphilharmonie  |  Hamburg, Germany  |  26 June 2017
 Pictorial Recital: "WOODLANDS and beyond…"  |  Photo Installation: Mat Hennek / Piano: Hélène Grimaud  |  Elbphilharmonie  |  Hamburg, Germany  |  8 April 2017
 Launch of the book "Woodlands – Mat Hennek", published by Steidl  |  Flo Peters Gallery  |  Hamburg, Germany  |  7 April 2017
 artgenève | palexpo SA – Bernheimer Fine Art  |  Genève – Switzerland | 26.01. – 29 January 2017
 "THE WORLD IS A BOOK AND THOSE WHO DO NOT TRAVEL READ ONLY ONE PAGE." Group exhibition | Bernheimer Fine Art | Lucerne – Switzerland | 20 October 2016 – 21 January 2017
2018
 Pictorial Recital: "WOODLANDS and beyond…"  |  Photo Installation: Mat Hennek / Piano: Hélène Grimaud  | Kulturpalast, Dresden, Germany | 8 June 2018
 Pictorial Recital: "WOODLANDS and beyond…"  |  Photo Installation: Mat Hennek / Piano: Hélène Grimaud  | Klavier-Festival Ruhr, Wuppertal, Germany | 6 June 2018
 Pictorial Recital: "WOODLANDS and beyond…"  |  Photo Installation: Mat Hennek / Piano: Hélène Grimaud  | Philharmonie, Gasteig, Munich, Germany | 3 March 2018
2019
 MAESTRI – MUSIK UND LEIDENSCHAFT | Group Exhibit | CAMERA WORK | Berlin | 15 June 2019 – 10 August 2019

References

External links 
 Official Website of photographer Mat Hennek
 Galerie Bernheimer Fine Art
 Galerie Flo Peters
 Galerie Immagis Fine Art Photography
 Publication at Steidl publishing house
 "Woodlands and beyond..." at Elbphilharmonie Hamburg
 "Woodlands and beyond..." at Philharmonie Munich
 Radio-interview on NDR Kultur
 Article "Süddeutsche Zeitung"
 Article "Die Welt"
 Mat Hennek at Photography-Now Photography Now

1969 births
Artists from Freiburg im Breisgau
Photographers from Baden-Württemberg
Living people